Michael Joseph Ruth (born June 25, 1964) is a former American football player.  Ruth was a member of the College Football All-America Team and the winner of the 1985 Outland Trophy as college football's best lineman.  
After two seasons in the NFL with the New England Patriots in 1986 and 1987, Ruth finished his pro career with the Barcelona Dragons of the World League of American Football in 1991 and 1992.

Ruth was inducted to the College Football Hall of Fame in December 2017.  He is the 10th former Boston College player or coach enshrined in the National Football Foundation College Football Hall of Fame.

He later graduated from Harvard University with a M.Ed. and is now a teacher at Everett High School in Massachusetts.

References

1964 births
Living people
All-American college football players
American football defensive tackles
Barcelona Dragons players
Boston College Eagles football players
New England Patriots players
Players of American football from Pennsylvania
Harvard Graduate School of Education alumni